Platymiscium albertinae is a species of plant in the family Fabaceae. It is found only in Honduras. It is threatened by habitat loss.

References

Dalbergieae
Endemic flora of Honduras
Critically endangered flora of North America
Taxonomy articles created by Polbot